Allepipona erythrura is a species of wasp in the Vespidae family. It was described by Giordani Soika in 1987 and is listed in Catalogue of Life: 2011 Annual Checklist.

References

Potter wasps
Insects described in 1987